Benton Township is a township in Faulkner County, Arkansas, United States. Its total population was 961 as of the 2010 United States Census, an increase of 24.16 percent from 774 at the 2000 census.

According to the 2010 Census, Benton Township is located at  (35.320424, -92.228274).

Part of the city of Quitman is located within the township.

References

External links 

Townships in Arkansas
Townships in Faulkner County, Arkansas